Lippestad is a Norwegian surname. Notable people with the surname include:

Geir Lippestad (born 1964) – Norwegian lawyer, politician, and social activist
Johan Andreas Lippestad (1902–1961) – Norwegian government minister

See also
Lippstadt
Lipstadt

Norwegian-language surnames